General Seymour may refer to:

Algernon Seymour, 7th Duke of Somerset (1684–1750), British Army general
Edward Seymour, 1st Duke of Somerset (1500–1552), English lieutenant general of the north
Francis Seymour, 5th Marquess of Hertford (1812–1884), British Army general
Sir Francis Seymour, 1st Baronet (1813–1890), British Army general
Truman Seymour (1824–1891), Union Army major general
William Seymour (British Army officer, born 1664) (1664–1728), British Army lieutenant general
Lord William Seymour (British Army officer) (1838–1915), British Army general
William Henry Seymour (1829–1921), British Army general